Ericameria crispa, the crisped goldenbush, is a rare North American species of flowering plants in the family Asteraceae. It has been found only on mountain slopes in the state of Utah in the western United States.

Ericameria crispa is a branching shrub up to 40 cm (16 inches) tall. Leaves are oblanceolate to spatulate, up to 30 mm (1.2 inches) long. One plant can produce many small, yellow flower heads, each with 14–24 disc florets but no ray florets.

References

External links
Photo of herbarium specimen at Missouri Botanical Garden, collected in Utah in 1981, isotype of Haplopappus crispus/Ericameria crispa

crispa
Flora of Utah
Endemic flora of the United States
Plants described in 1983
Flora without expected TNC conservation status